Parcells is a surname. Notable people with the surname include:

 Bill Parcells (born 1941), former American football head coach
 Elizabeth Parcells (1951–2005), American coloratura soprano
 Heather Parcells, American actress, singer, and dancer

See also 
 Parcell